CJYM (1330 AM) is a radio station broadcasting a classic hits format. Licensed to Rosetown, Saskatchewan, Canada, it serves west central Saskatchewan.

History
It first began broadcasting in 1966 under the call letters CKKR. CJYM is a Class B AM station which broadcasts with a power of 10,000 watts daytime and nighttime. CJYM is the only full-power station in Canada which broadcasts on 1330 kHz.

The station celebrated its 40th anniversary in 2006 with a large party at the Rosetown park. The station is currently owned by Golden West Broadcasting.

See also
CFYM

External links
 CJYM 1330
 
CFYM AM history - Canadian Communications Foundation (also includes CJYM)

Rosetown
Jym
Jym
Jym
Radio stations established in 1966
1966 establishments in Saskatchewan